Tommi Lenho (born 17 September 1975) is a Finnish former professional tennis player.

Lenho, a two-time national singles champion, competed for the Finland Davis Cup team from 1994 to 1998 and was unbeaten in three singles rubbers, which included a win over France's Guillaume Raoux.

On the professional tour, Lenho reached a best singles ranking of 291 in the world, with qualifying draw appearances at the US Open. His best performance on the Challenger Tour was a runner-up finish at the Tampere Open in 1998.

ITF Futures titles

Singles: (2)

Doubles: (2)

See also
List of Finland Davis Cup team representatives

References

External links
 
 
 

1975 births
Living people
Finnish male tennis players
People from Heinola
Sportspeople from Päijät-Häme